Nowcom founded in 1994, was a South Korean IT Company. Effective 2011, this corporate entity changed its name to AfreecaTV Co., Ltd after the AfreecaTV Co.,Ltd-ZettaMedia split.

The first service of Nowcom in South Korea was Nownuri which is VT-based online BBS started in 1994 and currently they operate Afreeca, TalesRunner, O2Jam and ClubBox as well as Nownuri.

Nowcom was merged by Wins Technet, a listed IT company, at January 2008 and listed on KOSDAQ with its original name though and worked together for 3 years, but finally they have been separated again to two companies as they were. Nowcom is still listed on KOSDAQ.

In July 2011, Nowcom announced that its assets would be split into one publicly traded company and the other privately held company. Another firm known as ZettaMedia was also established at that date and is a new spin-off company created during the split.

Services 
 Afreeca: Online TV with P2P video streaming service. Users can upload their own videos as well as live video streams.
 TalesRunner: Racing video game
 O2Jam: Music video game
 ClubBox: Web storage service for any internet community
 Nownuri: Classic VT BBS
 NOWCDN: CDN service for massive file distribution such as game clients

Split 
In July 2011, Nowcom announced that, after concerns from business differences between AfreecaTV and ClubBox, Nowcom's assets would be split into one publicly traded company, one oriented towards webcasting and online game development, and the other privately held company towards contents, media, and web storage. The split formally took place on July, 2011; where the present Nowcom was renamed AfreecaTV Co., Ltd. and consists primarily of Afreeca, TalesRunner, and O2Jam, while a new ZettaMedia was formed to take on Nownuri, PDBox, and ClubBox.

References

External links
 Nowcom Website

Software companies of South Korea
Entertainment companies of South Korea
Defunct video game companies of South Korea
Video game publishers
Video game development companies
Entertainment companies established in 1994
Video game companies established in 1994
South Korean companies established in 1994